Otari school is a state primary school in Wellington, New Zealand, formerly known as Wilton school. It is divided into three strands: one that teaches in the manner conventional to New Zealand schools, a Māori immersion stream, and a stream based around the principles of Montessori teaching. It has a focus on the environment. The school is located next to Otari, a botanical garden dedicated to native plants.

The school is also the site of Otari Preschool. As of 2012, the principal is Clifford Wicks.

Notes

Schools in Wellington City
Primary schools in New Zealand